Marcel Tissier (1 June 1903 – 5 January 1982) was a French racing cyclist. He rode in the 1930 Tour de France.

References

1903 births
1982 deaths
French male cyclists
Place of birth missing